Lewis Shepard Stone (November 15, 1879 – September 12, 1953) was an American film actor. He spent 29 years as a contract player at Metro-Goldwyn-Mayer and was best known for his portrayal of Judge James Hardy in the studio's popular Andy Hardy film series. He was nominated for the Academy Award for Best Actor in 1929 for his performance as Russian Count Pahlen in The Patriot. Stone was also cast in seven films with Greta Garbo, including in the role of Doctor Otternschlag in the 1932 drama Grand Hotel.

Early life 

Born in Worcester, Massachusetts in 1879, Lewis was the youngest of four children of Philena (née Ball) and Bertrand Stone. His father, according to the federal census of 1880, supported the family as a boot cutter. After obtaining his public education in Worcester, Lewis joined the United States Army during the Spanish–American War, serving as a lieutenant and later being deployed to China to train troops. He returned to the United States and following his discharge from the army, began his career as a writer and actor.

Career 
In the early-1900s Stone was considered by the critics to be the most popular leading man in stock in America. For eight years, he held the role as leading man with the Oliver Morosco Stock Company in Los Angeles.

In 1912, Stone found success in the popular play Bird of Paradise, which starred Laurette Taylor. The play was later filmed in 1932 and 1951.

For the summer of 1913 Stone appeared at Elitch Theatre in Denver, Colorado, as the leading man for the season. The proprietor of the theatre, Mary Elitch Long, recalled an event when Stone heard of a nearby family in need and he "went to a neighborhood grocery and, placing $25.00 on the counter, told the storekeeper to see to it that the bereaved little family wanted for nothing; and to let him know when more money was needed and to say nothing about it."

His career was interrupted by a return to the Army in World War I, serving as a major in the cavalry.

Before leaving for the war he made his feature film debut in Honor's Altar in 1916. He showed up in First National's 1920 Nomads of the North to good effect playing a Royal Canadian Mounted Policeman. He portrayed the title role in the 1922 silent film version of The Prisoner of Zenda.

From 1920 to 1927, he lived in Los Angeles at 212 S. Wilton Place. The home is now Los Angeles Cultural-Historic Monument #925 and is in the Wilton Historic District.

In 1924, he joined newly formed Metro-Goldwyn-Mayer studio and was contracted by it up until his death.

Stone was nominated for the Academy Award for Best Actor in 1929 for The Patriot. He played the character that gives the film its title, but he was not the top-billed star. He appeared in seven films with Greta Garbo, spanning both the silent and early sound periods. He played the role of Dr. Otternschlag in the Garbo film Grand Hotel, in which he utters the famous closing line "Grand Hotel. People coming. Going. Nothing ever happens."

He played a larger role in the 1933 Garbo film Queen Christina. His appearance in the successful prison film The Big House furthered his career. He played adventurers in the dinosaur epic The Lost World (1925) with Wallace Beery and The Mask of Fu Manchu (1932) with Boris Karloff, and a police captain in Bureau of Missing Persons (1933).

In 1937, Stone got the role which became his most famous, that of honest and kind-hearted Judge James Hardy in the Andy Hardy film series, starring Mickey Rooney. Stone appeared as the judge in 14 of the 16 Hardy movies, beginning with You're Only Young Once (1937). Lionel Barrymore had played the judge in the first Hardy movie, and Stone died before the making of the last one, Andy Hardy Comes Home (1958), so the judge's own death was mentioned in the film. During the heyday of the series, Stone also appeared with Rooney in the short subject Andy Hardy's Dilemma, which promoted charitable donations to the Community Chest.

During World War II, the 60-plus year-old Stone was a lieutenant colonel in the California National Guard.

Stone was MGM's longest-contracted actor and the longest-ever-contracted actor at a studio up to his death. The week before his death, he (together with Lionel Barrymore) received a gold key to his dressing room. He made approximately 100 movies.

Beach house and luxury yacht 
Stone owned a beach house in the Venice neighborhood of Los Angeles. In 1930 the oil drilling boom in the Venice Beach-Del Ray oil field caused him to file a law suit to stop the beach lease to prevent property damage and public nuisance. "The court ruled for Stone even though derricks ringed the beach ..."

In the 1930s he owned a 104-foot luxury yacht named Serena. In 1937 the yacht was sold to Robert Paine Scripps (the father of Charles Scripps) and converted to a research vessel named the E. W. Scripps.

Death 
Stone died in Hancock Park, Los Angeles on September 12, 1953, aged 73. He reportedly suffered a heart attack while chasing away some neighborhood kids who were throwing rocks at his garage or trampling his meticulously kept prized garden. Another published report states that on that date Stone and his third wife were watching television when they heard a racket in the back yard. When he investigated, Stone found lawn furniture once again floating in the pool and glimpsed three or perhaps four teenage boys running toward the street. Stone gave chase despite his wife's warning not to exert himself. Upon reaching the sidewalk, Stone suddenly collapsed. A gardener, Juan Vergara, witnessed the chase and summoned aid.

A photo published in newspapers of the day showed Stone lying on the sidewalk immediately after the incident. The photo was later included in Kenneth Anger's book of scandals titled Hollywood Babylon.

Lewis Stone was later honored with a star on the Hollywood Walk of Fame at 6524 Hollywood Blvd.

Selected filmography 

 The Bargain (1914)
 Honor's Altar (1916) as Warren Woods
 The Havoc (1916) (with Gladys Hanson) as Richard Craig
 According to the Code (1916) as Basil Beckenridge
 Inside the Lines (1918) as Captain Cavendish
 The Man of Bronze (1918) as John Adams
 Man's Desire (1919) as Tom Denton
 Milestones (1920) as John Rhead
 Nomads of the North (1920) as Cpl. O'Connor
 Held by the Enemy (1920) as Capt. Gordon Haine
 The Concert (1921) as Augustus Martinot
 Beau Revel (1921) as Lawrence 'Beau' Revel
 The Golden Snare (1921) as Sergeant Philip Raine
 Don't Neglect Your Wife (1921) as Langdon Masters
 The Child Thou Gavest Me (1921) as Edward Berkeley
 Pilgrims of the Night (1921) as Philip Champion / Lord Ellingham
 The Rosary (1922) as Father Brian Kelly
 A Fool There Was (1922) as John Schuyler
 The Prisoner of Zenda (1922) as Rudolf Rassendyll / King Rudolf
 Trifling Women (1922) as The Marquis Ferroni
 The Dangerous Age (1923) as John Emerson
 The World's Applause (1923) as John Elliott
 You Can't Fool Your Wife (1923) as Garth McBride
 Scaramouche (1923) as The Marquis de la Tour d'Azyr
 The Stranger (1924) as Keith Darrant
 Why Men Leave Home (1924) as John Emerson
 Cytherea (1924) as Lee Randon
 Husbands and Lovers (1924) as James Livingston
 Inez from Hollywood (1924) as Stewart Cuyler
 Cheaper to Marry (1925) as Jim Knight
 The Lost World (1925) as Sir John Roxton
 Confessions of a Queen (1925) as The King
 The Talker (1925) as Harry Lennox
 The Lady Who Lied (1925) as Horace Pierpont
 Fine Clothes (1925) as Earl of Denham
 What Fools Men (1925) as Joseph Greer
 Too Much Money (1926) as Robert Broadley
 The Girl from Montmartre (1926) asJerome Hautrive
 Old Loves and New (1926) as Gervas Carew
 Don Juan's Three Nights (1926) as Johann Aradi
 Midnight Lovers (1926) as Maj. William Ridgewell, RFC
 The Blonde Saint (1926) as Sebastian Maure
 An Affair of the Follies (1927) as Hammersley
 The Notorious Lady (1927) as Patrick Marlowe / John Carew
 Lonesome Ladies (1927) as John Fosdick
 The Prince of Headwaiters (1927) as Pierre
 The Private Life of Helen of Troy (1927) as Menelaus
 The Foreign Legion (1928) as Col. Destin
 The Patriot (1928) as Count Pahlen
 Freedom of the Press (1928) as Daniel Steele
 A Woman of Affairs (1928) as Dr. Hugh Trevelyan
 Wild Orchids (1929) as John Sterling
 The Trial of Mary Dugan (1929) as Edward West
 Wonder of Women (1929) as Stephen Trombolt
 Madame X (1929) as Louis Floriot
 Their Own Desire (1929) as Marlett
 Strictly Unconventional (1930) as Clive Champion-Cheney
 The Big House (1930) as Warden James Adams
 Romance (1930) as Cornelius Van Tuyl
 The Office Wife (1930) as Lawrence Fellowes
 Passion Flower (1930) as Antonio Morado
 Inspiration (1931) as Raymond Delval
 Father's Son (1931) as William Emory
 The Secret Six (1931) as Richard Newton, Attorney at Law
 My Past (1931) as Mr. John Thornley
 Always Goodbye (1931) as John Graham
 The Bargain (1931) as Maitland White
 The Phantom of Paris (1931) as Detective Costaud
 The Sin of Madelon Claudet (1931) as Carlo Boretti
 Mata Hari (1931) as Andriani
 Strictly Dishonorable (1931) as The Judge
 The Wet Parade (1932) as Roger Chilcote
 Grand Hotel (1932) as Dr. Otternschlag
 Night Court (1932) as Judge William Osgood
 Letty Lynton (1932) as District Attorney Haney
 New Morals for Old (1932) as Mr. Thomas
 Red-Headed Woman (1932) as William Legendre Sr.
 Unashamed (1932) as Henry Trask
 Divorce in the Family (1932) as John Parker
 The Mask of Fu Manchu (1932) as Nayland Smith
 The Son-Daughter (1932) as Dr. Dong Tong
 Men Must Fight (1933) as Edward Seward
 The White Sister (1933) as Prince Guido Chiaromonte
 Looking Forward (1933) as Gabriel Service Sr.
 Bureau of Missing Persons (1933) as Capt. Webb
 Queen Christina (1933) as Axel Oxenstierna
 You Can't Buy Everything (1934) as John Burton
 The Mystery of Mr. X (1934) as Inspector Connor
 The Girl from Missouri (1934) as Frank Cousins
 Treasure Island (1934) as Captain Smollett
 David Copperfield (1935) as Mr. Wickfield
 Vanessa: Her Love Story (1935) as Adam Paris
 West Point of the Air (1935) as General Carter
 Public Hero No. 1 (1935) as Prison Warden
 Woman Wanted (1935) as District Attorney Martin
 China Seas (1935) as Tom Davids
 Shipmates Forever (1935) as Adm. Richard Melville
 Tough Guy (1936) as Davis (scenes deleted)
 Three Godfathers (1936) as James Underwood, aka Doc
 The Unguarded Hour (1936) as General Lawrence
 Small Town Girl (1936) as Doctor Dakin
 Suzy (1936) as Baron Charville
 Sworn Enemy (1936) as Doctor Simon 'Doc' Gattle
 Don't Turn 'Em Loose (1936) as John Webster
 Outcast (1937) as Anthony Abbott (lawyer)
 The Thirteenth Chair (1937) as Inspector Marney
 The Man Who Cried Wolf (1937) as Lawrence Fontaine
 You're Only Young Once (1937) as Judge James K. Hardy
 The Bad Man of Brimstone (1937) as Mr. Jackson Douglas
 Judge Hardy's Children (1938) as Judge James K. Hardy
 Stolen Heaven (1938) as Joseph Langauer
 Yellow Jack (1938) as Major Reed
 Love Finds Andy Hardy (1938) as Judge James K. Hardy
 The Chaser (1938) as Dr. Delford Q. Prescott
 Out West with the Hardys (1938) as Judge James 'Jim' K. Hardy
 The Ice Follies of 1939 (1939) as Douglas Tolliver Jr.
 The Hardys Ride High (1939) as Judge James K. Hardy
 Andy Hardy Gets Spring Fever (1939) as Judge James K. Hardy
 Joe and Ethel Turp Call on the President (1939) as The President
 Judge Hardy and Son (1939) as Judge James K. Hardy
 Andy Hardy Meets Debutante (1940) as Judge James K. Hardy
 Sporting Blood (1940) as Davis Lockwood
 Andy Hardy's Dilemma: A Lesson in Mathematics... and Other Things (1940, short) as Judge James K. Hardy
 Andy Hardy's Private Secretary (1941) as Judge James K. Hardy
 Life Begins for Andy Hardy (1941) as Judge James K. Hardy
 The Bugle Sounds (1942) as Col. Jack Lawton
 The Courtship of Andy Hardy (1942) as Judge James K. Hardy
 Andy Hardy's Double Life (1942) as Judge James K. Hardy
 Plan for Destruction (1943, short) as Himself – Commentator
 Andy Hardy's Blonde Trouble (1944) as Judge James K. Hardy
 The Hoodlum Saint (1946) as Father Nolan
 Three Wise Fools (1946) as Judge James Trumbell
 Love Laughs at Andy Hardy (1946) as Judge James K. Hardy
 State of the Union (1948) as Sam Thorndyke
 The Sun Comes Up (1949) as Arthur Norton
 Any Number Can Play (1949) as Ben Gavery Snelerr
 Key to the City (1950) as Judge Silas Standish
 Stars in My Crown (1950) as Dr. Daniel Kalbert Harris, Sr.
 Grounds for Marriage (1951) as Dr. Carleton Radwin Young
 Night Into Morning (1951) as Dr. Horace Snyder
 Angels in the Outfield (1951) as Commissioner Arnold P. Hapgood
 Bannerline (1951) as Josh
 The Unknown Man (1951) as Judge James V. Hulbrook
 It's a Big Country (1951) as Church Sexton
 Just This Once (1952) as Judge Samuel Coulter
 Talk About a Stranger (1952) as Mr. Wardlaw
 Scaramouche (1952) as Georges de Valmorin
 The Prisoner of Zenda (1952) as The Cardinal
 All the Brothers Were Valiant (1953) as Capt. Holt

See also 
 List of actors with Academy Award nominations

References

External links 

 
 
 Lewis Stone at The New York Times Movies
 Lewis Stone at  The International Silent Movie
 Photographs of Lewis Stone

1879 births
1953 deaths
Military personnel from Massachusetts
United States Army Cavalry Branch personnel
Male actors from Worcester, Massachusetts
American male film actors
American male silent film actors
Metro-Goldwyn-Mayer contract players
20th-century American male actors
Burials at Kensico Cemetery
American military personnel of the Spanish–American War
United States Army personnel of World War I
United States Army officers